1994 Japanese Super Cup was the Japanese Super Cup competition. The match was played at National Stadium in Tokyo on March 5, 1994. Verdy Kawasaki won the championship.

Match details

References

Japanese Super Cup
1994 in Japanese football
Tokyo Verdy matches
Yokohama Flügels matches